Asiatosaurus (meaning "Asian lizard") is an extinct genus of herbivorous sauropod dinosaur which lived during the Early Cretaceous in Mongolia and China. The type species is known only from teeth, making it difficult to rely on information until more specimens are found to expand our knowledge, and another species is known, also based on scant remains; both are now classified as nomina dubia.. 

The type species, A. mongoliensis, was described by Osborn, in 1924, based on AMNH 6264, a broken tooth from the Öösh Formation of Övörkhangai Province, Mongolia. It was the first sauropod genus named from East-Asia.

A. kwangshiensis, the second species, was described by Hou, Yeh and Zhao, in 1975 based on IVPP V4794, a tooth, three cervical vertebrae and multiple ribs from the Xinlong Formation of Guangxi, China. The genus was classified within Brachiosauridae by Hou et al. in 1975, and considered a euhelopodid by Poropat et al. in 2022.

References

Early Cretaceous dinosaurs of Asia
Sauropods
Fossil taxa described in 1924
Taxa named by Henry Fairfield Osborn
Paleontology in Guangxi